Brainlab is a privately held German medical technology company headquartered in Munich, Bavaria. Brainlab develops software and hardware for radiotherapy and radiosurgery, and the surgical fields of neurosurgery, ENT and craniomaxillofacial, spine surgery, and traumatic interventions. Their products focus on image-guided surgery and radiosurgery, digital operating room integration technologies, and cloud-based data sharing.

History 
Brainlab was founded in Munich in 1989, by CEO Stefan Vilsmeier, at age 17. The first Brainlab product was a mouse-controlled, menu-driven surgical planning and navigation software introduced in 1990 at the University of Vienna and exhibited at the Congress of Neurological Surgeons (CNS) Annual Scientific Meeting in Washington, D.C. in 1992.

In 1993, Brainlab developed a linear accelerator-based system for stereotactic radiosurgery using micromultileaf collimators. Three years later, Brainlab entered into a partnership with Varian, Inc., which resulted in a long-time collaboration in the field of radiosurgery.

Brainlab expanded into the field of image-guided surgery in 1997 with the VectorVision Neuronavigation System and was the first to develop passive marker technology. In 1998, Brainlab became a public limited company (German: Aktiengesellschaft (AG)). The managing board at Brainlab today consists of: Stefan Vilsmeier, founder and Chief Executive Officer (CEO); Rainer Birkenbach, Chief Technology Officer, and Jan Merker, Chief Operating Officer (COO).

Brainlab introduced its first shaped-beam radiosurgery system, Novalis, in 1998. Lance Armstrong, a professional cyclist, who battled testicular cancer in 1996, became the spokesperson for the Novalis brand.

In 2007, the company released Novalis Tx Radiosurgery, a radiotherapy system jointly created by Brainlab and Varian Medical Systems, Inc. A year later, Digital Lightbox was brought to the market, allowing digital patient images to be viewed and manipulated in the operating room. Digital Lightbox was transformed in 2012 into the current product Buzz Digital O.R.

Other products include Curve Image Guided Surgery, Kick Navigation and Kick EM Navigation, and Buzz Digital O.R. Brainlab was the exclusive distributor for 5 years of Airo® Mobile Intraoperative CT, developed and manufactured by Mobius Imaging, LLC.

In March 2019, Smith & Nephew announced the acquisition of orthopedic joint reconstruction business unit of Brainlab to further its foray into robotic surgery.

In 2019, Brainlab recalled their spine and trauma 3D navigation software (version 1.0) because it could display inaccurate information during a procedure that could prevent the surgeon from accurately navigating surgical tools inside the patient.

On September 14, 2022, Stefan Vilsmeier, CEO and Claus Promberger, VP for R&D, from Brainlab, together with clinical partner Professor Cordula Petersen, MD from the UKE (Universitätsklinikum Hamburg-Eppendorf) in Hamburg, were nominated as one of the three finalists for the Federal President’s Award for Innovation and Technology (Deutscher Zukunftspreis) 2022 for the ExacTrac Dynamic technology, a highly precise radiation treatment for tumors in motion. The prize has been awarded annually by the German Federal President for over 25 years and honors outstanding technical, engineering, scientific as well as software and algorithm-based achievements within Germany.

Headquarters 
Brainlab began in the parental home of CEO and founder, Stefan Vilsmeier, in 1989. By 1991, Brainlab had moved into its first official headquarters in the Munich suburb of Poing. After a wave of new hires in 1995, a larger space was needed and headquarters moved to the Bavarian town of Heimstetten, Germany. In 2006, Brainlab constructed and moved into its headquarters in Feldkirchen, Germany, just outside Munich. Edmund Stoiber, former minister-president of Bavaria, officially opened the new building in 2007. In December 2016, Brainlab moved into a newly constructed headquarters in the Munich suburb of Riem on the grounds of the former Munich-Riem Airport. Featured speakers at the official inauguration ceremony on July 11, 2017, were the Bavarian State Minister Ilse Aigner and German Chancellor, Angela Merkel.

Stefan Vilsmeier 
Stefan Vilsmeier, a self-taught computer programmer, is a German entrepreneur, inventor, author, and founder, president and CEO of Brainlab.

In 2000, Vilsmeier became the youngest recipient of the Bavarian Order of Merit, presented to him by former Bavarian Minister-President, Edmund Stoiber. In 2001, Vilsmeier was awarded the national title of Entrepreneur of the Year in the category of Information Technology, by Ernst & Young. The following year, Ernst & Young awarded Vilsmeier with the title of World Entrepreneur of the Year at an awards event held in Monte Carlo. Also in 2002, the World Economic Forum (WEF) selected Vilsmeier as one of their Global Leaders for Tomorrow 2003. In 2014, Vilsmeier was awarded with the International Steven Hoogendijk Award from the Bataafsch Genootschap der Proefondervindelijke Wijsbegeerte for his service as a pioneer in the development of neuronavigation systems.

Subsidiaries 
In 2009, Brainlab began a partnership with Voyant Health, a Tel Aviv, Israel based company founded in 2003, focusing on orthopedic technology. In 2011, Brainlab announced that it would acquire Voyant Health.

Brainlab acquired Medineering and its line of robot-assisted surgery devices on March 20, 2019. In 2020, Brainlab announced two additional acquisitions. The first, in January 2020, was VisionTree Software Inc., a San Diego based company that develops cloud-based, patient-centric data collection and health management solutions. The acquisition of Level Ex, a Chicago-based medical video game maker, was announced in June 2020.

In June 2020, the foundation of Snke OS was announced, a Brainlab subsidiary (approx. 150 employees) focused on creating the first digital health technology platform for surgery.

In March 2021 Brainlab procured the german company Mint Medical, which is based in Heidelberg and develops image reading and reporting software for clinical routine and research.

In May 2022, Brainlab announced the majority acquisition of Austria-based robotic and medical device developer and manufacture MedPhoton. The acquisition came after an original partnership in 2020 in the field of intraoperative imaging, which resulted in the launch of a mobile imaging robot, Loop-x. MedPhoton will continue to operate as an independent research and development company within the Brainlab group.

In September 2022, Brainlab announced the acquisition of Dr. Langer Medical GmbH. Based in Waldkrich, Germany, the family-owned company specializes in the development of intraoperative neuromonitoring solutions and related equipment for surgical interventions.

References

External links
 Brainlab website

Medical technology companies of Germany
Companies based in Munich
1989 establishments in West Germany
Technology companies established in 1989